Barilius caudiocellatus is a fish in genus Barilius of the family Cyprinidae. It is found in China.

References 

C
Freshwater fish of China
Fish described in 1984